A Caress of the Void is the fourth studio album by American doom metal band Evoken. It was released on November 8, 2007.

Track listing

Credits
 John Paradiso – Guitars/Vocals, Keyboards
 Nick Orlando – Guitars
 Craig Pillard – Bass
 Vince Verkay – Drums

References

External links
 A Caress of the Void at MetalStorm.net

Evoken albums
2007 albums